Anna Wills (born October 13, 1984) is an American politician and former member of the Minnesota House of Representatives. A member of the Republican Party of Minnesota, she represented District 57B in the southern Twin Cities metropolitan area.

Education and early career
Wills attended Northwestern College. She was a legislative assistant for state Senator Michelle Benson from 2011 to 2012. Prior to that she worked at McDonald's and Caribou Coffee.

Minnesota House of Representatives
Wills was first elected to the Minnesota House of Representatives in 2012. She was subsequently re-elected in 2014 and 2016, but was defeated by DFL member John Huot in 2018.

Personal life

Wills is married to her husband, Rob, and they reside in Rosemount, Minnesota.

Anna Wills has worked in the restaurant industry and private in-home care services. She also worked as a Legislative Staffer in the Minnesota Senate.

Anna is the first homeschool graduate to be elected to the Minnesota Legislature and she attended the University of Northwestern, St. Paul. Anna got involved in the political process in her early teens, and has served in many volunteer leadership positions: as a volunteer coordinator, a campaign office manager, and as Burnsville City Chair for a 2008 Presidential Campaign.

Anna was first elected to the Minnesota House of Representatives in 2012, and subsequently re-elected in 2014 and 2016. She represented District 57B, which includes the cities of Rosemount, Apple Valley, and Coates. Anna served on several committees during her tenure in the Minnesota House: Education Finance, Education Policy, Legacy, State Government Finance and Veteran Affairs, and Taxes. Anna was also an ex-officio member of the ServeMinnesota Board during her years in office.

Anna and her husband, Rob, live in Rosemount with their three children. Rob and Anna are active members of Bethlehem Baptist Church.

References

External links

1984 births
Living people
University of Northwestern – St. Paul alumni
Republican Party members of the Minnesota House of Representatives
21st-century American politicians
People from Apple Valley, Minnesota